K.I.Z is a German hip hop group from Berlin. The members are the three rappers Tarek, Nico and Maxim. Until 2018, DJ Craft was also part of the group. Their lyrics often contain a lot of dark humor and irony as well as sociocritical content.

Style 
Characteristic for the group are sexist, provocative lyrics containing black humour, irony, sarcasm and cynicism. They also like to parody other rappers, people or the hip-hop genre itself, as heard on the song "Die kleinen Dinge im Leben" feat. Sido (engl. The Small Things in Life) where they have a competition of who has the smallest penis. K.I.Z satirically criticize society, politics and phenomena such as airs and graces, or life in the precariat. Nico considers his style to be pop, while Tarek sees the group as "something like the Onkelz of Reggae".

History 
The three members of K.I.Z started their careers in the Reimliga Battle Arena RBA (engl. Rhyme-League Battle Arena). Tarek named himself "Schwiegersohn" (engl. son-in-law), Maxim "Stiefvater" (engl. step-dad) and Nico "Warmer Bruder" (engl. warm brother, derogatory for gay man).

After the foundation of K.I.Z their first album RapDeutschlandKettensägenMassaker (engl. RapGermanyChainsawMassacre) was released on May 9, 2005, on the Label Royal Bunker. On February 17, 2006, their Mixtape Böhse Enkelz (engl. Evil Grandchildren, pun on Böhse Onkelz) was released. In August 2006, they were a supporting act for the Bloodhound Gang on the German leg of their tour, and in early 2007 for Prinz Pi on his !Donnerwetter! tour.

They were supposed to play at the aftershow party of the rock festival Rock am Ring in 2007, but their appearance was canceled shortly before because one of the festival's sponsors considered their lyrics to be too offensive. But they insisted on appearing there, so they played from the rooftop of a bus in the camping area in 2008. Playing hip-hop at a rock festival was considered to be a huge affront, prompting audience members to throw beer cans onto their stage.

On August 17, 2007, they were the center point of an XXL Edition of the MTV show Urban TRL. They played a live show presenting their first single "Geld essen" (engl. Eating Money) and were interviewed.

On August 20, 2007, they organized a concert with the motto "Reclaim your U-Bahn" in front of the train station Schlesisches Tor in Berlin Kreuzberg. Originally, the concert was slated to take place inside a train, but the BVG closed down the entire station and called the police, who appeared in riot gear. They tried to dissolve the gathering of approximately 1000 people and arrested eight.

Their album Hahnenkampf (engl. Cock Fight) was released on August 24, 2007, and distributed with the help of Universal, and was ranked 9th in the German sales charts.

In summer 2007 K.I.Z went on tour through Austria, Germany and Switzerland.  In the video based on their song "Geld essen" (engl. To Eat Money) one scene shows two homosexual men kissing. According to K.I.Z this is a personal statement against homophobia in hip-hop.

In 2008 the Berlin-based group was nominated for the German music award Echo in the category "Video national".  In spring 2008 K.I.Z again went on tour. DJ Craft and Nico, two of the band members, additionally performed as a Duo called "Turntable Hools" in all of the concerts of this tour.

The last single of their album Hahnenkampf, called "Neuruppin", was published in June 2008. It is a cover of a classic track "House of the Rising Sun" by The Animals. The lyrics deal with murder and cannibalism against women. The lyrics refer to the crimes of Carl Großmann, a serial killer born in Neuruppin in 1863. K.I.Z claim to not have known about this parallels between the lyrics and Großmann's crimes.
 
On July 10, 2009, the album Sexismus gegen Rechts (engl. Sexism Against The Right). The album criticizes, social, political and economical deficiencies.
In April 2010 K.I.Z started working on their new album Urlaub fürs Gehirn (engl. Vacation for the Brain), whose sound aesthetic was supposed to tie in with Hahnenkampf. The album was released on June 3, 2011, and hit the charts in position 4.

The International Women's Day in 2011 was the first time K.I.Z gave a concert in Berlin Kreuzberg which only women were allowed to visit. Such a concert was also played in 2012, 2013, 2014, and again in 2016. Furthermore, K.I.Z has toured as the opening act for the band Die Ärzte.

In January 2013 K.I.Z, in collaboration with the Berlin rapper Flexis, released the song "Strahlemann und Söhne" (engl. Big Smile Guy and Sons) via 16bars.de, that can be found on Flexis’ album Egotrips.

In June 2013 K.I.Z released their new video "Ich bin Adolf Hitler" (I am Adolf Hitler). The song is featured on the mixtape Ganz oben (engl. At the Very Top), which was released on July 9, 2013. In the video, the German-Jewish comedian Oliver Polak plays the role of Adolf Hitler.

On April 24, 2015, K.I.Z announced that they would release their fifth studio album Hurra die Welt geht unter (engl. Hooray, the Apocalypse is here) on July 10, 2015. Its tone is supposed to be more serious than their previous albums and mixtapes. Instead of a collection of several songs simply thrown together, there is going to be a central topic that the songs revolve around, like a concept album. The end of the world here is not supposed to be a negative event but rather a new start or a revolution.

In 2015 and 2016 they received a 1LIVE Krone music award as best live music act.

2017 saw the release of a song called "Glück gehabt" in which the group appears under the pseudonym "Die Schwarzwälder Kirschtorten", containing topics such as sex tourism in Thailand.

In March 2018, it was announced that DJ Craft had left the group.

In August 2018, the first album by Verbales Style Kollektiv, a group formed in 2013 by all K.I.Z members and various other artists, was released.

K.I.Z returned with a new song entitled "Berghainschlange" in 2020 and announced a new album, Und das Geheimnis der unbeglichenenen Bordellrechnung which was released on 4 December 2020. They also announced a tour in 2021 promoting their forthcoming album, Rap über Hass, which was released on 28 May 2021.

Political commitment 
In February 2010 K.I.Z uploaded a YouTube video in which they called people to participate in the anti-fascist protest Dresden Nazifrei (Nazi-free Dresden). On March 8, 2011, it was announced that Maxim and Nico would run in the 2011 Berlin state election as leading candidates for Die Partei in the Berlin borough of Friedrichshain-Kreuzberg. In 2016 they once more were leading candidates for Die PARTEI for the Berlin state election in the same borough. In September 2018 K.I.Z participated in a concert with other artists and bands in the German city of Chemnitz to make a statement against far-right protests and anti-immigrant violence. The show was attended by 65,000 people.

Members 
DJ Craft

(Full name: Sil-Yan Bori) Sil-Yan was born on January 25, 1985, in Berlin and has Hungarian roots. He started DJing at the age of 13. At his concerts he plays a mix of funk, hip-hop, drum and bass, and dancehall. Furthermore, he uses styles such as soca, klezmer, samba, bhangra, and gypsy. At the time of the founding of K.I.Z, he also formed part of the jazz/hip-hop group S.E.K. (Subground Entertainment Kombinat), serving as their DJ. In addition to this, he is also a member of the Berliner soundsystem Body Rock; together with DJs Mad Millian and Philipp, this group puts reggae, hip-hop, and dancehall styles at the forefront of their sound. He has also worked with the nu-metal band Instead, and in 2003 he was the DJ for the klezmer-punk-hip-hop group Rotfront. Since the summer of 2010, DJ Craft has been working extensively with the Drunken Masters, with whom KIZ has previously toured. DJ Craft left the group in 2018.

Maxim

(Full name: Maxim Drüner) He has French roots and is able to speak fluent French, which he demonstrates in his verse of the song 'Tanz'. Maxim grew up in Berlin-Kreuzberg, and began rapping with Tarek before K.I.Z had been founded. In his lyrics and interviews, he sometimes refers to himself as the White Giant, due to his size. He and his bandmate, Nico, were once both candidates for Die Partei for the Berlin City Parliament. In 2012 at a convention for Die Linke he held a discussion with the rapper Sookee regarding depictions of women, sexism, and homophobia in hip-hop.

Nico

(Full name: Nico Seyfrid) Nico grew up in Berlin-Hermsdorf and began rapping at the age of 15. His career, for which he stopped his studies in sociology, began with the founding of K.I.Z. Earlier in his career, he called himself Euro8000, but because of the artist Euroboy, the guitarist of the Norwegian death-punk band Turbonegro, who wore an SS flat cap, he decided to use his real name to avoid any possible confusion. Later he and his partner Grzegorz Olszówka, formerly the frontman for the Berlin-based band ArEt, formed the production duo known as Wass Bass. Wass Bass produces some beats for K.I.Z tracks, do some remixes and produce techno tracks, which they sometimes use to open for K.I.Z. In December 2012 the duo released their first album called "The Germans from the Future". In 2012 Nico also participated in the fifteenth Splash Festival in Ferropolis near Gräfenhainichen with Kraftklub under the pseudonym "Fledermausmann" (Batman). At the RapDeutschlandKattensägenMassaker he still performed under Euro or Euro2000.

Tarek

(Full name: Tarek Ebéné) He was born in Freiburg im Breisgau, but due to family circumstances moved to the Mediterranean coast of Spain. In his young adulthood he moved to Berlin, where he met Maxim, who he had rapped with prior to the foundation of K.I.Z. In his lyrics he sometimes refers to himself as Skinhead-Black or the Nubian Prince.

Discography

Albums

Mixtapes

Singles 

 2007: Fieber (Fever) (Peter Fox feat. K.I.Z)
 2009: Straße (Street) (feat. Celina)

Other releases 

2007: Wir sind auf Tour (Frauenarzt und K.I.Z) (Juice Exclusive! auf Juice-CD #78)

References

External links 

 Official homepage (German)
 First interactive music clip (Neuruppin) (German)

Musical groups from Berlin
German hip hop groups